Carlos Felipe Ignacio Espinosa Contreras (born 22 November 1982) is a Chilean football midfielder who currently plays for Deportes Santa Cruz.

Honours

Club
Cobreloa
 Primera División de Chile (1): 2004 Clausura

Universidad Católica
 Primera División de Chile (2): 2016 Clausura, 2016 Apertura
 Supercopa de Chile (1): 2016

References

External links

1982 births
Living people
Chilean footballers
People from Santiago
Footballers from Santiago
Chilean expatriate footballers
Association football midfielders
Cobreloa footballers
Club Deportivo Palestino footballers
Curicó Unido footballers
Deportes Melipilla footballers
Örgryte IS players
Rangers de Talca footballers
Cobresal footballers
FC Lyubimets players
A.C. Barnechea footballers
Coquimbo Unido footballers
C.D. Huachipato footballers
Club Deportivo Universidad Católica footballers
Deportes Iquique footballers
Deportes Santa Cruz footballers
Primera B de Chile players
Chilean Primera División players
Superettan players
Second Professional Football League (Bulgaria) players
Chilean expatriate sportspeople in Sweden
Chilean expatriate sportspeople in Bulgaria
Expatriate footballers in Sweden
Expatriate footballers in Bulgaria